This is an incomplete index of the current and historical principal family seats of clans, peers and landed gentry families in Ireland. Most of the houses belonged to the Old English and Anglo-Irish aristocracy, and many of those located in the present Republic of Ireland were abandoned, sold or destroyed following the Irish War of Independence and Irish Civil War of the early 1920s.

List of family seats of Irish Peers

Family seats of clans, baronets and gentry in Ireland

References

Bernard Burke, The General Armory of England, Scotland, Ireland, and Wales, Comprising a Registry of Armorial Bearings from the Earliest to the Present Time (Heritage Books, London, 1840)
Charles Mosley (Ed.), Burke’s Peerage, Baronetage and Knightage: Clan Chiefs, Scottish Feudal Barons (107th Edition, Burke's Peerage Ltd, London, 2003)
Burke's Landed Gentry (Burke's Peerage Ltd, London, 1921)
Charles Kidd (Ed.), Debrett's Peerage & Baronetage 2015 (149th Edition, Debrett's Ltd, London, 2014)
Joel Stevens, Symbola heroica: or the mottoes of the nobility and baronets of Great-Britain and Ireland; placed alphabetically (1736)

See also
List of family seats of English nobility
List of family seats of Scottish nobility
List of family seats of Welsh nobility

Irish,family seats
Lists of buildings and structures in the Republic of Ireland
Lists of buildings and structures in Northern Ireland

Lists of British nobility